Chanute High School is a public secondary school in Chanute, Kansas, United States, and operated by Chanute USD 413 school district.

Campus
The school's current building was completed in 2008.

Curriculum
Chanute High School offers a variety of courses, including concurrent classes through Neosho County Community College. With the construction of the new high school in 2008, a new trade building was completed. Welding and construction classes are offered as well as  Advanced Placement classes.  AP Calculus AB, AP European History, AP English Language and Composition and AP English Literature are taught currently.

Foreign languages courses include Spanish I-IV

Extracurricular activities
Student groups and activities at Chanute High School include Blue Comet Bands, chess club, Blue Comet Debate League, Blue Comet Forensics League, drama, Dungeons & Dragons, Family, Career and Community Leaders of America, Fellowship of Christian Athletes, Foreign Language Club, Future Business Leaders of America, HOSA (organization), history club, Kansas Future Educators of America, Leadership club, Model United Nations, National Honor Society, SkillsUSA, Student Government, Talent Search, Teen Age Republicans, Upward Bound, and vocal/choral music. In 2012,  Gay/Straight Alliance was formed by the students.

The school's athletic teams, known as the Chanute Blue Comets, compete in Kansas State High School Activities Association size classification 4A. Teams are fielded in baseball, basketball, cross country, football, soccer, softball, spirit, tennis, track, volleyball, men's and women's golf and wrestling.

Notable alumni
 Jimmy Allen - former lead guitarist and founder of rock band, Puddle of Mudd.
 Edwin Bideau - lawyer and politician
 Jennifer Knapp - Grammy-nominated singer and songwriter.
 Paul Lindblad - former MLB player (Kansas City Athletics, Washington Senators, Texas Rangers, New York Yankees).
 Ralph Miller - (class of 1937) - former college men's basketball coach

See also
 List of high schools in Kansas
 List of unified school districts in Kansas

References

External links
 Chanute High School
 The Comet (school newspaper)

Educational institutions established in 1914
Public high schools in Kansas
Schools in Neosho County, Kansas
1914 establishments in Kansas